Only the Valiant, also known as Fort Invincible, is a 1951 American Western film produced by William Cagney (younger brother of James Cagney), directed by Gordon Douglas and starring Gregory Peck, Barbara Payton, and Ward Bond. The screenplay was written by Edmund H. North and Harry Brown, based on the 1943 novel of the same name by Charles Marquis Warren.

Gregory Peck, in a role he considered a low point of his career, plays Captain Richard Lance, a by-the-book West Point graduate who is not very popular with the men under his command.

This film is in the public domain.

Plot
Following the American Civil War, peace is maintained in the New Mexico Territory by Fort Invincible, a fortification set up outside a mountain pass that blocks marauding bands of Apache. The Apache are able to eventually take the fort by cutting off its water supply, then assaulting the fort when its garrison is at its weakest and killing all the defenders.

Captain Richard Lance arrives with a patrol soon after the battle and captures Tucsos, the charismatic leader of the Apache. Lance's scout advises the captain to kill Tucsos, but Lance will not shoot a prisoner.

Back at the headquarters of the 5th Cavalry, the invalid commanding officer orders Lance to assign an officer to command an escort to take Tucsos to a larger post. Lance decides to lead the patrol himself, but at the last minute, the colonel says he needs Lance to stay at the fort in case of an Apache attack, and orders him to assign another (but more popular) officer, Lieutenant Holloway, to lead the small group of men escorting Tucsos. The Apache free Tucsos and Lieutenant Holloway ends up dead. The men at the fort blame Captain Lance, unaware of the colonel's order. They believe that his decision to assign Lieutenant Holloway to the dangerous mission was for a personal reason (both officers were vying for the affection of Cathy Eversham, an officer's daughter). Cathy Eversham believes it too, and bitterly breaks up with him.

Lance's standing with the soldiers at the fort only gets worse when he assembles a group of misfit cavalrymen to hold off the rampaging Indians at the ruins of Fort Invincible, which is considered a suicide mission.

Cast
 Gregory Peck as Captain Richard Lance
 Barbara Payton as Cathy Eversham
 Ward Bond as Corporal Timothy Gilchrist
 Gig Young as 1st Lieutenant William Holloway
 Dan Riss as 1st Lieutenant Jerry Winters
 Clark Howat as Lieutenant Underwood 
 Neville Brand as First Sergeant Ben Murdock
 Herbert Heyes as Colonel Drumm
 Art Baker as Captain Jennings
 Hugh Sanders as Captain Eversham 
 Lon Chaney, Jr. as Trooper Kebussyan ("the Ay-rab")
 Warner Anderson as Trooper Rutledge
 Steve Brodie as Trooper Onstot
 Terry Kilburn as Trooper Saxton
 Jeff Corey as Joe Harmony
 Michael Ansara as Tucsos
 Nana Bryant as Mrs. Drumm

Reception
According to Warner Bros accounts, the film earned $1,796,000 domestically and $1,630,000 foreign.

Time Out said "The often brutal physical confrontations show the kind of edge [the director] could deliver when he put his mind to it, and a sinewy, unsympathetic Peck impresses." Leonard Maltin says it is "unusually brutal." In a review of the 2013 Blu-ray release, Creative Loafing assessed that "This middling Western isn't awful so much as it's awfully indifferent." The reviewer cited a routine and largely nonsensical plot, but praised the fun supporting performances from Ward Bond and Lon Chaney, Jr., and gave the film two stars.

See also
List of Western films 1950–54

References

Further reading

External links

 
 
 
 
 DVD Review Review of the film & DVD at Vista Records
 DVD Review Review of the film & DVD at DVD Verdict

1951 films
American historical films
Warner Bros. films
American black-and-white films
Films scored by Franz Waxman
Films based on American novels
Films based on Western (genre) novels
Films directed by Gordon Douglas
Films set in New Mexico
1950s historical films
1951 Western (genre) films
Western (genre) cavalry films
Films with screenplays by Harry Brown (writer)
American Western (genre) films
1950s English-language films
1950s American films